Guntakal Railway Division is one of the three divisions of South Coast Railway zone (SCoR) of the Indian Railways. The headquarters of the division is at Guntakal and its zonal headquarters is at Visakhapatnam. This division is second in terms of route kilometres after Secunderabad railway division.

History 
Guntakal division was created in 1956 as a part of the Southern Railway zone. It was transferred to South Central Railway zone on 2 October 1977. After the formation of Visakhapatnam railway zone on 27 February 2019, Guntakal is under South Coast Railway zone.

Jurisdiction 
It covers the states of Andhra Pradesh, Karnataka and Tamil Nadu.
 In Andhra Pradesh it covers a total distance of 1302.9 route km.
 In Karnataka it covers a total distance of 142.2 route km.
 In Tamil Nadu it covers a total distance of 6.86 route

Sections and branch lines 

The lines and sections under the jurisdiction of the Guntakal division are listed below:

Source:
Guntakal Division System map

Note:
excl.– Station excluded / not under the divisional jurisdiction
km– Kilometer measure of distance between two lines

Stations and categories 

The below table depicts the stations under the Guntakal division and their category.

Performance and earnings 
Guntakal division generates revenue mainly from tourism and freight. There are many religious destinations as well natural tourism spots which draws tourists from various places. The freight revenue is due to the availability of large number natural resources, industries based on these resources and nearby ports.

See also 

 Divisions of Indian Railways

References 

 
1958 establishments in Andhra Pradesh
Transport in Guntakal
South Central Railway zone